The Nigeria Women's Super Cup, otherwise known as NWFL Champions Shield is an annual game, featuring the teams that won the Aiteo Cup and the Nigeria Women Premier League in the previous season. The first edition was contested on March 4, 2018 between Nasarawa Amazons and Rivers Angels at Agege Stadium, Lagos. The game also signals the curtain opener for the new football season.

Past winners 
 2018: Rivers Angels
 2019: Bayelsa Queens

References 

National women's association football supercups
Recurring sporting events established in 2018
Women's football competitions in Nigeria
2018 establishments in Nigeria